The Pakistan Hockey Super League, or "The Max" also known as PHSL, is an upcoming franchise-based field hockey tournament in Pakistan. It is to be organized by the Pakistan Hockey Federation. Its inaugural edition is slated to be held in 2022.

History 

In February 2016, the Pakistan Hockey Federation initiated preparations for a domestic hockey league, to be played from October to November 2016, according to then Secretary Shahbaz Ahmed Senior. The former Olympian believed development and growth of young Pakistani hockey players would rely on the success of the league, and this would help Pakistan regain its historic aura as a hockey-playing nation. 

An autonomous board for the league was established in 2016. PHF President Khalid Sajjad Khokhar mentioned that the League would be sanctioned by the International Hockey Federation (FIH), adding that the PHF was in touch with the world hockey governing body to avoid any clash with international events. The league was postponed after the government of Punjab refused to give an NOC to host the event in 2016.

In December 2017, it was announced that the PHSL was given an NOC. The inaugural season was slated to begin in April 2018, but was postponed to July 2018 due to the national team's participation in the 2018 Commonwealth Games, and the forthcoming month of Ramadan. 

It was further pushed back to 12 to 19 January 2019. Around a dozen international players (from Germany, Netherlands, Spain, Belgium, France, and Argentina) were expected to play, with all matches taking place in Lahore.  However, due to a lack of funds, the tournament was postponed to 15 to 25 March 2019 . More delays meant that the tournament could not take place for at least the next three years.

On 11 January 2022, the Pakistan Hockey Federation announced that the inaugural edition of the PHSL would take place in 2022.

Teams 

Six teams have been proposed for the league in its inaugural season. Details suggest a model that closely mimics that of the successful Pakistan Super League, whereby each team would be a franchise. The team names were revealed on 24 December 2018.

Rules and regulations 
International players are eligible to compete in the tournament, with each team able to field two of them in a match. Moreover, an maximum age limit of 25 years for all players is in effect.

See also 
 Field hockey
 International Tournaments (field hockey)
 Pakistan men's national field hockey team

References

External links 

    
Field hockey leagues in Asia
Field hockey competitions in Pakistan
Professional sports leagues in Pakistan
2016 establishments in Pakistan